Potassium bisulfate/ Potassium bisulphate is an inorganic compound with the chemical formula KHSO4 and is the potassium acid salt of sulfuric acid.  It is a white, water-soluble solid.

Preparation
More than 1 million tons were produced in 1985 as the initial stage in the Mannheim process for producing potassium sulfate. The relevant conversion is the exothermic reaction of potassium chloride and sulfuric acid:
KCl  +  H2SO4   →  HCl  +  KHSO4

Potassium bisulfate is a by-product in the production of nitric acid from potassium nitrate and sulfuric acid:
 KNO3 + H2SO4 → KHSO4 + HNO3

Chemical Properties
Thermal decomposition of potassium bisulfate forms potassium pyrosulfate:
 2 KHSO4 → K2S2O7 + H2O

Above 600 °C potassium pyrosulfate converts to potassium sulfate and sulfur trioxide:
K2S2O7 → K2SO4 + SO3

Uses
Potassium bisulfate is commonly used to prepare potassium bitartrate for winemaking. Potassium bisulfate is also used as a disintegrating agent in analytical chemistry or as a precursor to prepare potassium persulfate, a powerful oxidizing agent.

Occurrence
Mercallite, the mineralogical form of potassium bisulfate, occurs very rarely. Misenite is another more complex form of potassium bisulfate with the formula K8H6(SO4)7.

References 

Sulfates
Potassium compounds
Acid salts